Oko proroka (film) is a Polish historical film. It was released in 1982.

References

External links
 

1982 films
Polish historical films
1980s Polish-language films
1980s historical films